Moussa Sy (born 12 July 1979 in Conakry) is a Guinean football Striker with the Long Island Rough Riders of the United Soccer Leagues.

External links
  Mussa Sy at USL Soccer

1979 births
Living people
Guinean footballers
Association football forwards
Sportspeople from Conakry
21st-century Guinean people